The Walgalu are an Aboriginal people of highland southeast New South Wales, Australia. The Ngambri may belong to the Walgalu grouping, but are often treated separately.

Language
According to some scholars, the Walgalu language is a form of Ngarigo.

Country
Kiandra was located within their boundaries, whose southern extension ran down Tintaldra, and whose northeastern limits were at Queanbeyan. Josephine Flood argued, on the basis of a note in Alfred William Howitt, that they were attested as far south as the upper Murray site of Kauwambal between Mount Kosciuszko and Mount Cobberas, which would place their summer camping somewhat west of the Djilamatang.

According to Steven Avery, culture group boundaries in southeastern Australia are disputed, due in part to the inexactitude of linguistically assigned boundaries and the uncertainty of historical records.

The Cooma local government website, based on recent research, differentiates between two Aboriginal groups which resided in their region, stating that "the two main groups on Monaro were the Ngarigo people of the tablelands and the Wogul or Wolgalu group in the high country."

Alternative names
 Guramal (Wiradjuri language = "hostile men")
 Gurmal
 Tumut River people
 Tumut tribe
 Walgadu
 Wolgah
 Wolgal
 Murrin 

Source:

Notes

Citations

Sources

Further reading

Aboriginal peoples of New South Wales
Indigenous Australians in the Australian Capital Territory
Brindabella Ranges
Canberra
Extinct languages of the Australian Capital Territory